The 2019 King Cup Final was the 44th final of the King Cup, Saudi Arabia's main football knock-out competition.

It took place on 2 May 2019 at the King Fahd International Stadium in Riyadh, Saudi Arabia and was contested between Al-Ittihad and Al-Taawoun. It was Al-Taawoun's second King Cup final and Al-Ittihad's 18th. This was the first-ever meeting between these two clubs in the final. 

Al-Taawoun won the game 2–1 to secure their first title. As winners of the 2019 King Cup, Al-Taawoun qualified for the 2020 AFC Champions League group stage and the 2019 Saudi Super Cup.

Teams

Venue

The King Fahd International Stadium was announced as the final venue on 30 April 2019. This was the sixth King Cup final hosted in the King Fahd International Stadium following those in 1988, 2008, 2009, 2010, and 2013.

The King Fahd International Stadium was built in 1982 and was opened in 1987. The stadium was used as a venue for the 1992, 1995, and the 1997 editions of the FIFA Confederations Cup. Its current capacity is 68,752 and it is used by the Saudi Arabia national football team, Al-Nassr, Al-Shabab, and major domestic matches.

Background
Defending champions Al-Ittihad reached a record 18th final after a 4–2 win against Pro League champions Al-Nassr, beating them for the second time in a week. This was Al-Ittihad's second consecutive final, and sixth final since the tournament was reintroduced. 

Al-Taawoun reached their second final, after a historic 5–0 away win against Al-Hilal. They finished as runners-up in their previous final appearance, losing to Al-Nassr. This was Al-Taawoun's first appearance in the final as a top-tier side, as they were a second-tier side in 1990.

The two teams met twice in the Pro League, with Al-Taawoun winning the first match 5–3 in Buraidah. The second match ended in a 0–0 draw in Jeddah. This was the first meeting between the two sides in the King Cup.

Road to the final
Note: In all results below, the score of the finalist is given first (H: home; A: away).

Match

Details

{| width="100%"
|valign="top" width="40%"|

Statistics

See also

2019 King Cup
2018–19 Saudi Professional League
2019 Saudi Super Cup

References

External links

2019
Sports competitions in Saudi Arabia
May 2019 sports events in Asia
Ittihad FC matches
Al-Taawoun FC matches